The 1996 National League Division Series (NLDS), the opening round of the 1996 National League playoffs, began on Tuesday, October 1, and ended on Saturday, October 5, with the champions of the three NL divisions—along with a "wild card" team—participating in two best-of-five series. The teams were:

(1) Atlanta Braves (Eastern Division champion, 96–66) vs. (4) Los Angeles Dodgers (Wild Card, 90–72): Braves won series, 3–0.
(2) San Diego Padres (Western Division champion, 91–71) vs. (3) St. Louis Cardinals (Central Division champion, 88–74): Cardinals won series, 3–0.

The St. Louis Cardinals and Atlanta Braves both swept their Division Series, and went on to meet in the NL Championship Series (NLCS). The Braves would rally to win that series four games to three and become the National League champion, but would lose to the American League champion New York Yankees in the 1996 World Series.

Matchups

San Diego Padres vs. St. Louis Cardinals

Atlanta Braves vs. Los Angeles Dodgers

San Diego vs. St. Louis

Game 1
Busch Stadium (II) in St. Louis

The Cardinals and Padres met for the first time in the postseason. A three-run home run by Gary Gaetti off Joey Hamilton put the Cardinals up for good. Todd Stottlemyre pitched masterfully, allowing only a home run by Rickey Henderson. Rick Honeycutt and Dennis Eckersley shut the Padres down for the win.

Game 2
Busch Stadium (II) in St. Louis

A well fought Game 2 saw the Cardinals squander two leads. Scott Sanders faced Andy Benes. Willie McGee put the Cardinals on top on the third with an RBI single after two walks. Ken Caminiti tied the game with a leadoff home run in the fifth. In the bottom of the inning, Sanders allowed two singles and a walk to load the bases with one out before Ron Gant cleared them with a double off of Dario Veras to make it 4–1 Cardinals. In the sixth, after back-to-back one-out singles, a two-run single by Tony Gwynn aided by center fielder Willie McGee's throwing error made it a one-run game in the Padres sixth. In the eighth, Benes allowed a leadoff single and walk. A sacrifice bunt moved the runners up off of Rick Honeycutt before an RBI ground out by Steve Finley tied the game, but in the bottom half, Doug Bochtler walked two and threw a wild pitch to put runners on second and third with one out. Tom Pagnozzi's ground out off of Trevor Hoffman scored Brian Jordan and put the Cardinals up 5–4. Dennis Eckersley got his second save of the postseason with a perfect ninth.

Game 3
Jack Murphy Stadium in San Diego

In Game 3, the Cardinals looked to Donovan Osborne to put the Padres away. Opposing the potential sweep was Andy Ashby. Brian Jordan put the Cardinals ahead when he singled to center field to score Royce Clayton, who walked to lead off and moved to second on a single. After back-to-back one-out singles, Chris Gomez's fielder's choice and Jody Reed's double scored a run each to put the Padres up 2–1. Then Ken Caminiti homered to make it 3–1 in the third. An RBI single in the bottom of the fourth by Reed after back-to-back leadoff singles made it 4–1 Padres and Osborne was done. A leadoff homer by Ron Gant made it 4–2 in the sixth. Then, Jordan singled, stole second, and scored on a one-out triple by John Mabry. Tim Worrell relieved Ashby and allowed an RBI single to Tom Pagnozzi to tie the game at four. The Cardinals would take the lead in the seventh when Ray Lankford scored on a bases-loaded double play by Gant. Caminiti's second home run of the game off of Rick Honeycutt tied the game in the eighth, However, after a walk in the ninth, Jordan hit a two-run home run off of Trevor Hoffman that proved to be the series winner. A one-out single by Rickey Henderson in the ninth put the tying run at the plate but nothing would be made of it as Eckersley got his third save in as many tries to win the series.

Composite box
1996 NLDS (3–0): St. Louis Cardinals over San Diego Padres

Atlanta vs. Los Angeles

Game 1
Dodger Stadium in Los Angeles

The Braves were heavy favorites against the Dodgers, who sneaked into the playoffs on a Wild Card berth. This would be manager Bill Russell's only postseason series as Dodgers manager.

The Braves sent 24-game winner John Smoltz to the mound for Game 1. Opposing Smoltz would be Ramón Martínez. The Braves struck first when Fred McGriff's sacrifice fly brought Marquis Grissom, who singled to lead off, stole second and moved to third on a groundout, home in the fourth. Todd Hollandsworth tied the game with an RBI-double in the fifth after a lead off double by Greg Gagne. Smoltz and Martinez dueled for eight innings, when Martinez left the game. When the game moved to extra innings, eventual playoff MVP Javy López hit the go-ahead home run in the tenth off of Antonio Osuna. Mark Wohlers recorded the save and the Braves led the series 1–0.

Game 2
Dodger Stadium in Los Angeles

Greg Maddux faced Ismael Valdez in Game 2. Another pitcher's duel took place. Todd Hollandsworth singled to lead off the first and moved to second thanks to an error by Ryan Klesko, Hollandsworth moved to third on a groundout, then scored on Mike Piazza's groundout, but Klesko homered with one out in the bottom half to tie the game at one. Piazza singled to lead off the fourth and moved to second on an error by Marquis Grissom, then Raul Mondesi's RBI double made it 2–1 Dodgers. Fred McGriff led off the seventh inning with a home run to tie the game at two. After Klesko was called out on strikes, Jermaine Dye hit a home run to give the Braves a 3–2 lead. Mark Wohlers got another save in the ninth as the Braves now led the series 2–0 going home.

Game 3
Atlanta–Fulton County Stadium in Atlanta

Hideo Nomo faced Tom Glavine for Game 3. The night would sour for Nomo as he gave up a first-inning run, thanks to a McGriff double that scored Chipper Jones, who singled with two outs, and squandered the series in the fourth. Glavine doubled with two outs, then Grissom walked. A double by Mark Lemke scored both Glavine and Grissom. Then Jones homered to put the Braves up 5–0. Nomo was finished and so were the Dodgers. They would scratch out a run apiece in the seventh (on Juan Castro's double to score Greg Gagne, who singled with two outs) and eighth (on Mike Piazza's sacrifice fly off of Mike Bielecki after Greg McMichael allowed a leadoff walk and subsequent double), but no more. Wohlers got his third save in as many tries to end the series.

Composite box
1996 NLDS (3–0): Atlanta Braves over Los Angeles Dodgers

References

External links
STL vs. SDP at Baseball-Reference
ATL vs. LAD at Baseball-Reference

National League Division Series
National League Division Series
Atlanta Braves postseason
St. Louis Cardinals postseason
San Diego Padres postseason
Los Angeles Dodgers postseason
National League Division Series
National League Division Series
National League Division Series
National League Division Series
National League Division Series
1990s in San Diego
20th century in St. Louis
National League Division Series